This article lists post-Soviet conflicts, the violent political and ethnic conflicts in the countries of the former Soviet Union following its dissolution on 26 December 1991.

Some of these conflicts such as the 1993 Russian constitutional crisis or the 2013 Euromaidan protests in Ukraine were due to political crises in the successor states. Others involved separatist movements attempting to break away from one of the successor states.

Frozen conflicts

Some post-Soviet conflicts ended in a stalemate or without a peace treaty, and are referred to as frozen conflicts. This means that a number of post-Soviet states have sovereignty over the entirety of their territory in name only. In reality, they do not exercise full control over areas still under the control of rebel factions. In many instances, these territories have institutions which are similar to those of fully-fledged independent states, albeit with little or no international recognition, including Abkhazia and South Ossetia in Georgia; Artsakh in western Azerbaijan; Transnistria in  Moldova; and previously, the Donetsk People's Republic and Luhansk People's Republic  in Ukraine.

Recognition of these states varies. Transnistria has not received recognition from any UN member state, including Russia. Abkhazia and South Ossetia have received recognition from Russia, Nicaragua, Venezuela, Nauru and Syria. The Donetsk and Luhansk People's Republics had received recognition from Russia, Syria, and North Korea before their unrecognized annexation by Russia.

Central Asia

North Caucasus

South Caucasus

Eastern Europe

See also
Community for Democracy and Rights of Nations
List of wars: 1990–2002
List of wars: 2003–present
Military history of the Russian Federation
Post-Soviet states
Second Cold War
Ethnic conflicts in the Soviet Union

References

Post-Soviet conflicts
Aftermath of the Cold War
Dissolution of the Soviet Union
Soviet Union, Post
Conflicts
Russian and Soviet military-related lists
Asia-related lists
Europe-related lists